The following is a list of episodes for the a British reality television series, The Valleys that first aired on MTV on 25 September 2012. During the course of the series, 22 episodes plus 1 special episode of The Valleys have aired.

Series overview

Episodes

Series 1 (2012)

Series 2 (2013)

Series 3 (2014)

References 

Valleys, The